3-Hexyne is the organic compound with the formula C2H5CCC2H5. This colorless liquid is one of three isomeric hexynes. 3-Hexyne forms with 5-decyne, 4-octyne, and 2-butyne a series of symmetric alkynes. It is a reagent in organometallic chemistry.

References

Alkynes